Irevanly is a village in the municipality of Goranboy in the Goranboy District of Azerbaijan.

References

Populated places in Goranboy District